The 1952 NFL Championship Game was the 20th annual championship game, held on December 28 at Cleveland Municipal Stadium in Cleveland, Ohio.

The Detroit Lions (9–3) were the National Conference champions and met the Cleveland Browns (8–4), champions of the American Conference. It was the first of three consecutive matchups in the title game between the Lions and Browns.

The Lions were led by quarterback Bobby Layne, running back Doak Walker, and head coach Buddy Parker, and the Browns were led by head coach Paul Brown and  quarterback Otto Graham. The Lions returned to the title game after 17 years, since their win in 1935.

The Lions finished the 1952 regular season tied with the Los Angeles Rams (9–3) for top of the National Conference. Even though the Lions won both meetings, the rules of the day called for a tiebreaker playoff game. The teams' third game was held at Briggs Stadium in Detroit on December 21, which the Lions also won, 31–21.

The Lions were 3½-point favorites in the title game, and won by ten points, 17–7.

Game summary
Detroit took the opening kickoff, failed to gain, and punted, with Renfro getting back 11 yards to the Browns' 41. A couple of offside penalties were costly, but the Browns still managed to reach the 18, as Graham was then tossed for an 11-yard loss and the threat ended with Lou Groza missing a field goal from the 25. Detroit then moved upfield, getting to the Cleveland 30, but also failed to score when Pat Harder was short and wide with a field goal bid from 37 yards out.

Punter Horace Gillom punted a short kick, which rolled out at midfield, with the Lions going 50 yards in seven plays. Layne started it with a pass to Cloyce Box for 10 yards to the 40 and then ran for 13 and another first down on the 27. Layne added nine more before Walker made a first down on the 16, from where Layne passed to Bill Swiacki for 14 yards to the three. After an offsides penalty, Layne would run the ball in for a touchdown and led at halftime, 7–0.

The second half started with the Browns moving steadily, until checked by David's interception. Detroit was halted on this chance with the ball, but clicked the next time when Walker broke away for the touchdown that boosted the lead to 14 points. A Cleveland third quarter touchdown narrowed the lead to 7, but a defensive stand from the Lions from their own 5 along with a late Pat Harder field goal sealed the victory and the Lions' first championship since 1935.

Scoring summary
Sunday, December 28, 1952
Kickoff: 1 p.m. EST

First quarter
no scoring
Second quarter
DET – Bobby Layne 2-yard run (Pat Harder kick), 7–0 DET
Third quarter
DET – Doak Walker 67-yard run (Harder kick), 14–0 DET
CLE – Chick Jagade 7-yard run (Lou Groza kick), 14–7 DET
Fourth quarter
DET – FG Harder 36, 17–7 DET

Officials

Referee: Thomas Timlin
Umpire: Samuel Wilson
Head Linesman: Charlie Berry
Back Judge: James Hamer
Field Judge: Lloyd Brazil 
 

Players' shares
The gross receipts for the game, including radio and television rights, were just over $314,000. Each player on the winning Lions team received $2,274, while Browns players made $1,712 each, the highest to date.

References

External links
 Harold Sauerbrie, "Lions Beat Browns, 17–7, For Title", Cleveland Plain Dealer, December 28, 1952, Browns history database retrieved December 12, 2007

Championship Game, 1952
1952 NFL Championship Game
Cleveland Browns postseason
Detroit Lions postseason
NFL Championship Game
December 1952 sports events in the United States
Sports competitions in Cleveland